Glyphoturris quadrata, common name the square glyph-turrid, is a species of small carnivorous sea snail, a marine gastropod mollusk in the family Mangeliidae.

The subspecies Glyphoturris quadrata rugirima (Dall, 1889) is a synonym of Glyphoturris rugirima (Dall, 1889)

Distribution
G. quadrata can be found in Atlantic waters, ranging from the eastern coast of Florida and the Gulf of Mexico, south to Brazil, and also surrounding Bermuda.; in the Gulf of Mexico, the Caribbean Sea and the Lesser Antilles.

Description
The size of the shell varies between 4 mm and 6.8 mm.

The shell is strongly biangulated on the body whorl. The ribs are distant and conspicuous. The revolving sculpture is fine and close. The color of the shell is whitish or yellowish. The interstices of the ribs often are chestnut-colored.

Glyphoturris diminuta was previously thought to differ from Glyphoturris quadrata (Reeve, 1845) in the greater strength of the sculpture. The aperture and the columella are white.

References

External links
 
 Tucker, J.K. 2004 Catalog of recent and fossil turrids (Mollusca: Gastropoda). Zootaxa 682:1–1295.
 G., F. Moretzsohn, and E. F. García. 2009. Gastropoda (Mollusca) of the Gulf of Mexico, Pp. 579–699 in Felder, D.L. and D.K. Camp (eds.), Gulf of Mexico–Origins, Waters, and Biota. Biodiversity. Texas A&M Press, College Station, Texas
 Adams, C. B. 1850. Description of supposed new species of marine shells which inhabit Jamaica. Contributions to Conchology, 4: 56–68, 109–123
  Bouchet P., Kantor Yu.I., Sysoev A. & Puillandre N. (2011) A new operational classification of the Conoidea. Journal of Molluscan Studies 77: 273–308. 
 De Jong K.M. & Coomans H.E. (1988) Marine gastropods from Curaçao, Aruba and Bonaire. Leiden: E.J. Brill. 261 pp.

quadrata
Gastropods described in 1845